Nanon is an island in Papua New Guinea located in Milne Bay.

References

Islands of Milne Bay Province